Got is the name of the world's first cloned fighting bull who was born on 18 May 2010 in Spain by a team from the Prince Felipe Research Center and the Valencia Foundation for Veterinary Research.

He was cloned from another fighting bull named Vasito, and scientists are hoping that he displays similar fighting characteristics of his "father". The project of cloning a fighting bull took three years, in part because scientist struggled with how to preserve "valuable bull genes". Although he is the first fighting bull cloned, Got is not the first ever bull cloned, that honor is believed to be bestowed on "Second Chance" who was born in 1999.

References

Cloned animals
2010 animal births
Individual bulls in sport
Individual animals in Spain